Nghi Vo is an American author of short stories, novellas, and novels.

Biography 
Vo was born in Peoria, Illinois, where she lived until attending college at the University of Illinois Urbana-Champaign. Vo now lives in Milwaukee, Wisconsin on the shores of Lake Michigan. She defines her sexuality as queer.

Vo’s first published short story was "Gift of Flight" in 2007, after which she published a number of short stories in various media. In 2020 Vo published the novella The Empress of Salt and Fortune, which won the Hugo Award for Best Novella and the 2021 IAFA Crawford Award, and was a Locus, and Ignyte Award finalist. It was followed by the sequel When the Tiger Came Down the Mountain. The two novellas together are part of 'The Singing Hills Cycle', with 3 more novellas in the cycle having been acquired for Tor.com by Ruoxi Chen. Her debut novel The Chosen and the Beautiful, a queer magical retelling of The Great Gatsby was published in 2021 and her second novel Siren Queen, an urban fantasy set in pre-Code Hollywood, was released in May 2022.

Bibliography

Novellas
 The Empress of Salt and Fortune (2020)
 When the Tiger Came Down the Mountain (2020)
 Into the Riverlands (2022)

Novels 
 The Chosen and the Beautiful (2021)
 Siren Queen (2022)

References

External links 
 
 
 
 

1981 births
Living people
21st-century American women writers
American fantasy writers
21st-century American short story writers
American women short story writers
Writers from Peoria, Illinois
Hugo Award-winning writers
Queer women
American LGBT novelists
LGBT people from Illinois
Queer writers
21st-century American LGBT people
Women science fiction and fantasy writers